Satyajeet Dubey (born 21 July 1990) is an Indian voice and film actor, working in the Hindi film industry. He started his career with Roshan Abbas' Always Kabhi Kabhi.

Early life
Satyajeet Dubey was born in Bilaspur, Chhattisgarh, India. He studied classes 9th and 10th from St. Francis Senior Secondary School Bilaspur, Chhattisgarh and after completing his schooling in 2007 he moved to Mumbai to become an actor. He did backstage for theatre productions where he witnessed veteran actors performing on stage. He then started auditioning for acting jobs. He had a brief stint with television and did ad films for leading brands.

Career
He made his debut at age 20. In 2009, he was selected for the role of Tariq Naqvi in Roshan Abbas' "Always Kabhi Kabhi", opposite Zoa Morani, and producer Shah Rukh Khan. The film released on 17 June 2011, and was not successful at the box office. Dubey has also done advertisements like Pizza Hut, Kitkat, Reliance Big-TV and HDFC Bank. He portrayed the role of Nana Saheb in historical serial Jhansi Ki Rani in the year 2009. He played the lead role in the Disney made-for-television movie Luck Luck Ki Baat 2012. He played a double role in the 2015 comedy movie Baankey Ki Crazy Baarat. His "Kerry on kutton" released in 2016 July where he played the role of kerry a small town uncouth raw badass guy. Also featured in short film in 2018 called Love Bites opposite Harleen Sethi. Since March 2020, he is playing Sanjay Arora in Maharaj Ki Jai Ho!.

Satyajeet recently starred in Mumbai Diaries 26/11 created by Nikkhil Advani and produced by Emmay Entertainment. It also stars Mohit Raina, Konkana Sen Sharma, Tina Desai, and Shreya Dhanwanthary in the lead roles.

Filmography

Film

Television

References

External links
 
 

1990 births
Living people
21st-century Indian male actors
Male actors from Chhattisgarh
Male actors in Hindi cinema
People from Bilaspur, Chhattisgarh